Federal Highway 140 (Carretera Federal 140) is a Federal Highway of Mexico. The highway travels from Veracruz, Veracruz in the east to Tepeaca, Puebla in the west.

References

140
Transportation in Puebla
Transportation in Veracruz
Puebla (city)
Veracruz (city)